The 1980 Fiji rugby union tour of New Zealand was a series of twelve matches by the Fiji national rugby union team in New Zealand in August and September 1980. The Fiji team won only four of the twelve matches, and lost the single international match against a New Zealand XV – for which New Zealand did not award full international caps.

Matches
Scores and results list Fiji-s points tally first.

Notes

References

Fiji rugby union tour
Fiji national rugby union team tours
Rugby union tours of New Zealand
tour
tour